Shlomo ben Afeda Ha-Kohen or Solomon Afeda Cohen (in ) (1826–1893) was a Karaite Jewish hakham of the nineteenth century considered the last of the Karaite sages of Constantinople.
He is famous for his two abridgements of Elijah Bashyazi's masterpiece "Aderet Eliyahu" (The Mantle of Elijah): Sefer Gefen Ha-Adderet  composed in 1860 and Sefer Yeriot Shelomoh  composed in 1862.
Solomon Cohen proposed shortening the prayers of the Karaite festivals with the aim to attract more Karaites to the temple (Knessa).
He also worked as a scribe and composed many poems.

Biography 
His biography has been reported by Abraham Danon in 1925. He was born in Constantinople in 1826 (5586 in the Hebrew calendar), of a family that emigrated from Damascus, Syria after the dispersion of the Karaite community of the city. He learned to read and write in the small communal school from a teacher whose knowledge did not go beyond reading and he left school at a young age. Driven by the love of Jewish studies, he returned to student life under the supervision of his uncle Isaac Cohen who was a hakham. After that, Solomon Cohen did not have recourse to any teacher but studied by himself all the works of the Karaite authors, both printed and manuscript, as well as the works of the Jews of Spain, which he said were "truly inspired by God".

In 1860 and 1862, he wrote his most famous works on the Karaite Halakhah. Having given up his small business to devote himself definitively to his literary career, he was appointed head of the community of the Constantinopolitan Karaites, as well as officiating minister and teacher.

He resigned in 1870 and was replaced by Sabbatai Mengoubi (born about 1835). The following year he left for Cairo ( Egypt), where he was appointed head of the local Karaite community, and remained there until 1874. His successor, Sabbatai Mengoubi, resigned from his post in Constantinople and went to Cairo to take his place. Solomon Cohen then returned to Constantinople and was again appointed head of the community there (1874–81).

Family 
Shlomo ben Afeda Ha-Kohen and Shlomo-Yedidia ben Eliezer Afeda Yerushalmi Kohen belong to the same family.

References

Resources 
 Constantinopolitan Karaites
 Mikdash Me'at: An English Language Abridgement of Adderet Eliyahu Translation with commentary, by Tomer Mangoubi, of Khacham Elijah Bashyazi's 15th century masterpiece of Jewish law.
 The Yeriot Shelomo text in Hebrew
 Sefer ha-mitsṿot Gefen ha-Adderet
 Sefer ha-mitsṿot Yeriʻot Shelomoh

Writers from Istanbul
Byzantine philosophers
Philosophers of Judaism
Karaite rabbis
Karaite Jews
Karaite Judaism
1826 births
1893 deaths
19th-century rabbis from the Ottoman Empire